The men's slalom competition of the Vancouver 2010 Olympics was held at Whistler Creekside in Whistler, British Columbia, on February 27, 2010.

Giuliano Razzoli of Italy won the gold and Ivica Kostelić of Croatia picked up his second silver medal of these Olympics; André Myhrer of Sweden took the bronze.

The last alpine event of the 2010 Olympics was held in challenging weather conditions, which included rain.  The start was lowered 66 vertical feet (20 m), the same start as the women's race.  More than 40 racers failed to complete the first run, including ten of the first thirty.

Results

References

External links
 2010 Winter Olympics results: Men's Slalom (run 1), from vancouver2010.com; retrieved 2010-02-27.
 2010 Winter Olympics results: Men's Slalom (run 2), from vancouver2010.com; retrieved 2010-02-27.

Slalom
Winter Olympics